Worcester College Boat Club (WCBC) is a rowing club for members of Worcester College, Oxford. It is based on the Isis at Boathouse Island, Christ Church Meadow, Oxford, Oxford.

History
The club was founded in 1825 and shares the boathouse building with Merton College Boat Club. In 1825 the club competed in bumps racing with Jesus, Brasenose, Christ Church and Exeter. The Alumni are known as Martlets.

Honours

Henley Royal Regatta

See also
University rowing (UK)
Oxford University Boat Club
Rowing on the River Thames

References

Rowing clubs of the University of Oxford
Worcester College, Oxford
Rowing clubs in Oxfordshire
Rowing clubs of the River Thames
Sport in Oxford
Rowing clubs in England